The list of polychaete worms of South Africa is a list of species that form a part of the class Polychaeta (Phylum Annelida) fauna of South Africa. The list follows the SANBI listing.

Amphinomida 
Order Amphinomida

Amphinomidae 
Family Amphinomidae
 Genus Amphinome:
 Amphinome rostrata (Kinberg, 1867), syn. Amphinome (Plerone) tetraedra, Amphinome lepadis, Amphinome luzoniae, Amphinome natans, Amphinome pallasii, Amphinome quatrefagesi, Amphinome tetraedra, Aphrodita rostrata, Asloegia capillata, Colonianella rostrata, Pleione tetraedra
 Genus Chloeia:
 Chloeia inermis Quatrefages, 1866, syn. Chloeia gilchristi, Chloeia spectabilis
 Chloeia flava (Pallas, 1766), syn. Amphinome capillata, Aphrodita flava, Chloeia ancora, Chloeia capillata, Chloeia ceylonica, Chloeia incerta, Chloeia natalensis, Thesmia flava
 Chloeia fusca McIntosh, 1885, syn. Chloeia longisetosa 
 Genus Eurythoe:
 Eurythoe complanata (Pallas, 1766), syn. Amphinome jamaicensis, Amphinome macrotricha, Aphrodita complanata, Blenda armata, Eurythoe albosetosa, Eurythoe alcyonaria, Eurythoe assimilis, Eurythoe capensis, Eurythoe corallina, Eurythoe ehlersi, Eurythoe havaica, Eurythoe indica, Eurythoe kamehameha, Eurythoe laevisetis, Eurythoe pacifica, Eurythoe pacifica levukaensi, Lycaretus neocephalicus, Pleione alcyonea
 Eurythoe parvecarunculata Horst, 1912, syn. Eurythoe heterotricha
 Genus Hipponoa:
 Hipponoa gaudichaudi Audouin & Milne Edwards, 1833, syn. Hipponoa gaudichaudi agulhana
 Genus Linopherus:
 Linopherus microcephala Fauvel 1932, syn. Pseudeurythoe microcephala 
 Genus Pareurythoe:
 Pareurythoe chilensis (Kinberg, 1867), syn. Eurythoe chilensis

Euphrosinidae 
Family Euphrosinidae
 Genus Euphrosine:
 Euphrosine capensis Kinberg, 1857, syn. Euphrosine polybranchia, Euphrosyne capensis
 Euphrosine myrtosa Savigny in Lamarck, 1818, syn. Euphrosyne myrtosa

Echiuroidea 
Order Echiuroidea

Echiuridae 
Family Echiuridae
 Genus Anelassorhynchus:
 Anelassorhynchus gangae Biseswar, R., 1984
 Anelassorhynchus indivisu Sluiter, 1900 syn. Thalassema indivisus
 Anelassorhynchus moebii Greeff, 1879 syn. Thalassema moebii
 Genus Echiurus:
 Echiurus antarcticus Spengel, 1912
 Echiurus echiurus Pallas, 1766 syn. Lumbricus echiurus
 Genus Listriolobus:
 Listriolobus capensis Jones & Stephen, 1966
 Genus Ochetostoma:
 Ochetostoma arkati Prashad, 1935
 Ochetostoma baronii Greeff, 1879 syn. Ochetostoma baroni
 Ochetostoma cxaudex Lampert, 1883
 Ochetostoma decameron Lanchester, 1905
 Ochetostoma erythrogrammon Leuckart & Ruppell, 1828
 Ochetostoma formosulum Lampert, 1883
 Ochetostoma kempi Prashad, 1919
 Ochetostoma natalense Biseswar, R., 1988
 Ochetostoma palense Ikeda, 1924
 Genus Thalassema:
 Thalassema diaphanes Sluiter, 1888
 Thalassema elapsum  Sluiter, 1912
 Thalassema jenniferae Biseswar, R., 1988
 Thalassema thalassemum Pallas, 1766 syn. Lumbricus thalassemum; Thalassema neptuni 
 Thalassema philostracum Fisher, 1947

Eunicida 
Order Eunicida

Dorvilleidae 
Family Dorvilleidae
 Genus Ophryotrocha:
 Ophryotrocha puerilis Claparède & Metschnikow, 1869, syn. Paractius mutabilis, Staurocephalus minimus
 Protodorvillea biarticulata  Day, 1963, endemic
 Protodorvillea egena  (Ehlers, 1913), syn. Dorvillea gracilloides, Dorvillea mandapamae, Protodorvillea mandapamae, Stauronereis egena
 Schistomeringos neglecta  (Fauvel, 1923), syn. Dorvillea neglecta, Staurocephalus neglectus, Stauronereis neglectus
 Schistomeringos rudolphi  (Delle Chiaje, 1828), syn. Dorvillea rudolphi, Nereis rudolphi, Nereis rudolphii, Prionognathus ciliata, Schistomeringos rudolphi,  Schaurocephalus chiaji, Staurocephalus ciliatus robertianae, Staurocephalus pallidus, Staurocephalus rudolphii, Stauronereis madeirae, Stauronereis polyodonta, Stauronereis rudolphi, Stauronereis rudolphii, Syllis rudolphiana

Eunicidae 
Family Eunicidae
 Genus Eunice:
Eunice laticeps  Ehlers 1868, syn. Eunice tentaculata
Eunice cincta  (Kinberg, 1865), syn Nicidion cincta
Eunice antennata  (Savigny in Lamarck, 1818), syn. Eunice longiqua, Leodice antennata	
Eunice australis  Quatrefages, 1866, syn. Eunice leuconuchalis, Eunice paucibranchis
Eunice vittata  (Delle Chiaje, 1828), syn. Eunice congesta, Eunice minuta, Eunice pellucida, Nereis vittata
Eunice indica  Kinberg, 1865	
Eunice tubifex  Crossland, 1904, syn. Euniphysa tubifex	
Eunice norvegica  (Linnaeus, 1767), syn. Eunice gunneri, Leodice gunneri, Nereis madreporae pertusae, Nereis norvegica
Eunice pennata  (O.F. Müller, 1776), syn. Eunice (Eunice) pennate, Nereis pennata	
Eunice aphroditois  (Pallas, 1788), syn. Eunice flavopicta, Leodice gigantea, Nereis aphroditois	
Eunice grubei  Gravier, 1900		
Eunice filamentosa  Grube & Örsted in Grube, 1856, syn. Eunice cirrobranchiata
Eunice afra  Peters, 1855
 Genus Lysidice:
Lysidice natalensis  Kinberg, 1865, syn. Lycidice natalensis, Lysidice atra, Lysidice capensis	
Lysidice collaris  Grube, 1870, syn. Lycidice lunae, Lycidice pectinifera, Lysidice fallax, Lysidice fusca, Lysidice parva, Lysidice robusta, Lysidice sulcata
 Genus Marphysa:
Marphysa depressa  (Schmarda, 1861), syn. Eunice depressa
Marphysa sanguinea  (Montagu, 1815), syn. Leodice opalina, Lysidice multicirrata, Marphysa acicularum, Marphysa acicularum brevibranchiata, Marphysa haemasoma, Marphysa iwamushi, Marphysa leidii, Marphysa nobilis, Marphysa parishii, Marphysa sanguinea americana, Marphysa viridis, Nereis sanguinea
Marphysa macintoshi  Crossland, 1903	
Marphysa purcellana  Willey, 1904 endemic
Marphysa posteriobranchia  Day, 1962 endemic
Marphysa corallina  (Kinberg, 1865), syn. Marphysa capensis, Nauphanta corallina
 Genus Nematonereis:
Nematonereis unicornis  Grube 1840, syn. Lumbriconereis unicornis, Nematonereis grubei, Nematonereis unicornis
Genus Palola:
Palola siciliensis  (Grube, 1840), syn. Eunice siciliensis, Nereidonta paretti, Palolo siciliensis

Lumbrineridae 
Family Lumbrineridae
 Genus Lumbrineris:
 Lumbrineris magalhaensis Kinberg, 1865, syn. Lumbriconereis magalhaensis, Lumbriconeries pettigrew
 Lumbrineris meteorana Augener, 1931, syn. Lumbriconereis meteorana
 Lumbrineris albidentata Ehlers, 1908, syn. Lumbriconereis albidentata
 Lumbrineris brevicirra (Schmarda, 1861), syn. Lumbriconeris brevicirrus, Limbrinereis brevicirra, Notocirrus brevicirrus
 Lumbrineris inflata Moore, 1911, syn. Lumbriconereis gurjanovea, Lumbrinereis cervicalis
 Lumbrineris coccinea (Renier, 1804), syn. Lumbriconeris coccinea, Lumbrineris vasco, Nereis coccinea 1804
 Lumbrineris oculata Ehlers, 1908, syn. Lumbriconereis oculata, endemic
 Lumbrineris cavifrons Grube, 1866, syn. Lumbriconereis cavifrons, Lumbrinereis cavifrons
 Lumbrineris latreilli Audouin & Milne Edwards, 1834, syn. Lumbriconereis edwardsii, Lumbriconereis floridana, Lumbriconereis futilis, Lumbriconereis nardonis, Lumbriconereis tingens, Zygolobus grubianus
 Lumbrineris aberrans Day, 1963, syn. Lumbrinereis aberrans, endemic
 Lumbrineris tetraura (Schmarda, 1861), syn. Lumbriconereis (Notocirrus) tetraura, Lumbriconereis tetraura, Lumbriconereis tetraura, Notocirrus tetraurus
 Lumbrineris hartmani Day, 1953, syn. Lumbrinereis hartmani, endemic
 Lumbrineris heteropoda Day, 1963, syn. Lumbrineris heteropoda atlantica
 Lumbrineris heteropoda Marenzeller, 1879, syn. Lumbriconereis heteropoda
 Lumbrineris papillifera Fauvel, 1918, syn. Lumbriconereis papillifera

Oenonidae 
Family Oenonidae
 Genus Arabella:
 Arabella mutans (Chamberlin, 1919), syn. Arabella novecrinita, Aracoda obscura, Cenothrix mutans
 Arabella iricolor (Schmarda, 1861), syn. Aracoda caerulea, Aracoda capensis, Notocirrus capensis
 Genus Drilognathus:
 Drilognathus capensis  Day, 1960 endemic
 Genus Drilonereis:
 Drilonereis monroi  Day, 1960 endemic
 Drilonereis falcata  Moore 1911
 Genus Oenone:
 Oenone fulgida  (Savigny in Lamarck, 1818), syn. Aglaura fulgida, Aglaurides erythreaeensis, Aglaurides erythraeensis symmetrica, Aglaurides fulgida, Halla australis, Oenone diphyllidia, Oenone haswelli, Oenone lucida, Oenone pacifica, Oenone symetrica, Oenone telura, Oenone vitensis

Onuphidae 
Family Onuphidae
 Genus Brevibrachium:
 Brevibrachium capense  Day, 1960, syn. Rhamphorachium capense, endemic
 Genus Diopatra:
 Diopatra cuprea (Bosc, 1802), syn. Diopatra brasiliensis, Diopatra fragilis, Diopatra frontalis, Diopatra spiribranchis, Diopatra variegata, Nereis cuprea	
 Diopatra cuprea  Ehlers 1908, syn. Diopatra punctifera, endemic
 Diopatra dubia Day, 1960 endemic
 Diopatra gilchristi Day, 1960, syn. Epidiopatra gilchristi endemic
 Diopatra monroi Day, 1960 endemic
 Diopatra neapolitana Delle Chiaje, 1841, syn. Diopatra baeri, Diopatra gallica, Diopatra iridicolor
 Diopatra neapolitana Day, 1960 endemic
 Diopatra papillosa Day, 1967, syn. Epidiopatra papillosa
 Genus Epidiopatra:
 Epidiopatra hupferiana Day, 1957
 Genus Heptaceras:
 Heptaceras quinquedens  Day, 1951, syn. Onuphis quinquedens
 Genus Hyalinoecia:
 Hyalinoecia tubicola (O.F. Müller, 1776), syn. Hyalinoecia platybranchis, Neris tubicola, Onuphis filicornis, Omnuphis sicula
 Genus Nothria:
 Nothria conchylega  (Sars, 1835), syn. Northria concyphilla, Onuphis britannica, Onuphis conchylega, Onuphis eschrichti, Onuphis hyperborea, Onuphis jopurdei	
 Genus Onuphis:
 Onuphis eremita  Audouin & Milne Edwards, 1833, syn. Diopatra simplex, Onuphis landanensis, Onuphis pancerii
 Onuphis geophiliformis  (Moore, 1903)
 Onuphis holobranchiata  Marenzeller, 1879, syn. Onuphis (Nothria) holobranchiata
 Genus Paradiopatra:
 Paradiopatra quadricuspis M. Sars in G.O. Sars 1872, syn. Onuphis quadricuspis, Sarsonuphis quadricuspis
 Genus Paronuphis:
 Paronuphis antarctica (Monro, 1930), syn. Paranuphis abyssorum abyssorum
 Genus Rhamphobrachium:
 Rhamphobrachium chuni  Ehlers, 1908

Phyllodocida 
Order Phyllodocida

Acoetidae 
Family Acoetidae
 Genus Panthalis:
 Panthalis oesterdi  McIntosh, 1924, endemic

Alciopidae 
Family Alciopidae
 Genus Alciopa:
 Alciopa reynaudii Audouin & Milne-Edwards, 1833
 Genus Alciopina:
 Alciopina parasitica Claparède & Panceri, 1867
 Genus Krohnia:
 Krohnia lepidota (Krohn, 1845), syn. Alciopa cirrata, Alciopa lepidota, Callizona cincinnata, Callizonella pigmenta
 Genus Naiades:
 Naiades cantrainii Delle Chiaje, 1828, syn. Alciopa cantraini, Alciopa distorta, Alciopa edwardsii, Alciopa mutilata, Alciope microcephala, Liocapa vitrea
 Genus Plotohelmis:
 Plotohelmis tenuis (Apstein, 1900), syn. Corynocephalus tenuis
 Plotohelmis capitata (Greeff, 1876)
 Genus Rhynchonereella:
 Rhynchonereella angelini (Kinberg, 1866), syn. Callizona grubei, Callizona henseni, Eulalia magnapupula, Kronia angelini, Rhynchonereella angelinia, Rhynchonerella angeleni, Rhynchonerella angelini, Rhynchonerella parva, Rhynchonerella pycnocera
 Rhynchonereella gracilis Costa, 1864, syn. Callizona japonica, Callizona nasuta, Kronia aurorae
 Rhynchonereella moebii (Apstein, 1893), syn. Callizona moebii, Rhynchonerella moebii
 Rhynchonereella petersii (Langerhans, 1880), syn. Alciopa (Halodora) petersii, Alciopa cari, Corynocephalus magnachaetus, Rhynchonerella petersi, Rhynchonerella petersii, Vanadis heterochaeta, Vanadis setosa
 Genus Torrea:
 Torrea candida (Delle Chiaje, 1841), syn. Alciopa candida, Alciopa vittata, Asterope candida, Liocapa vertebralis, Torrea vitrea
 Genus Vanadis:
 Vanadis formosa Claparède, 1870, syn. Alciopa longirhyncha, Vanadis fuscapunctata, Vanadis greeffiana, Vanadis latocirrata, Vanadis longicauda, Vanadis pelagica, Vanadis uncinata 
 Vanadis crystallina Greeff, 1876, syn. Vanadis augeneri, Vanadis collata, Vanadis ornata
 Vanadis minuta Treadwell, 1906	
 Vanadis violacea Apstein, 1893	
 Vanadis longissima (Levinsen, 1885), syn. Rhynchonerella longissima, Vanadis fasciata, Vanadis grandis, Vanadis pacifica

Aphroditidae 
Family Aphroditidae
 Genus Aphrodita
 Aphrodita alta Kinberg, 1856	
 Genus Laetmonice
 Laetmonice benthaliana McIntosh, 1885, syn. Laetmonice filicornis benthaliana, Laetmonice producta benthaliana
 Laetmonice hystrix (Savigny in Lamarck, 1818), syn. Aphrodita mediterranea, Hermione hystrix, Hermonia hystrix, Iphione hystrix
 Genus Pontogenia
 Pontogenia chrysocoma (Baird, 1865), syn. Aphrodita echinus, Aphrodite echinus, Hermione chrysocoma

Chrysopetalidae 
Family Chrysopetalidae
 Genus Bhawania
 Bhawania goodei Webster, 1884, syn. Chrysopetalum elegans, Palmyra elongata
 Genus Paleanotus
 Paleanotus chrysolepis Schmarda, 1861

Eulepethidae 
Family Eulepethidae
 Genus Grubeulepis
 Grubeulepis geayi (Fauvel, 1918), syn. Eulepis geayi, Pareulepis geayi

Glyceridae 
Family Glyceridae
 Genus Glycera
 Glycera alba  (O.F. Müller, 1776), syn. Glycera albicans, Glycera branchialis, Glycera danica, Nereis alba
 Glycera benguellana  Augener, 1931, syn. Glycera capitata benguellana
 Glycera longipinnis  Grube, 1878		
 Glycera natalensis  Day, 1957, endemic
 Glycera papillosa  Grube, 1857		
 Glycera prashadi  Fauvel, 1932, syn. Glycera convoluta capensis
 Glycera subaenea  Grube, 1878, syn. Glycera saccibranchis
 Glycera tridactyla  Schmarda, 1861, syn. Glycera convoluta, Glycera convoluta sevastopolica, Glycera convoluta suchumica, Glycera convoluta uncinata, Glycera retractilis	
 Glycera unicornis  Savigny in Lamarck, 1818, syn. Glycera goesi, Glycera kraussii, Glycera meckelii, Glycera mesnili, Glycera nicobarica, Glycera rouxii

Goniadidae 
Family Goniadidae
Genus Glycinde
 Glycinde capensis  Day, 1960, endemic
 Glycinde kameruniana  Augener, 1918
Genus Goniada
 Goniada emerita Audouin & Milne-Edwards, 1833
 Goniada maculata  Örsted, 1843, syn. Glycera viridescens, Goniada alcockiana 	
Genus Goniadella
 Goniadella gracilis  (Verrill, 1873), syn. Eone gracilis
Genus Goniadopsis
 Goniadopsis incerta  (Fauvel, 1932)
 Goniadopsis maskallensis  (Gravier, 1904), syn. Glycinde maskallensis
Genus Ophioglycera
 Ophioglycera eximia  (Ehlers, 1901)

Hesionidae 
Family Hesionidae
Genus Kefersteinia
 Kefersteinia cirrata (Keferstein, 1863), syn. Castalia fusca hibernica, Hesione fusca, Kefersteinia claparedii, Psamathe cirrhata
Genus Leocrates
 Leocrates claparedii  Costa in Claparede 1868, syn. Castalia claperedii, Leocrates giardi, Tyrrhena claparedii	
Genus Oxydromus
 Oxydromus angustifrons (Grube, 1878), syn. Irma angustifrons, Irma latifrons, Ophiodromus angustifrons, Podarke angustifrons
 Oxydromus agilis (Ehlers, 1864), syn. Ophiodromus agilis, Podarke agilis 
Genus Podarkeopsis
 Podarkeopsis capensis  (Day, 1963), syn. Gyptis capensis, Oxydromus capensis
Genus Syllidia
 Syllidia armata Quatrefages, 1866, syn. Magalia perarmata, Nereimyra britannica, Psammate britannica
 Syllidia capensis (McIntosh, 1925), syn. Magalia capensis, endemic

Iospilidae 
Family Iospilidae
 Genus Iospilus
 Iospilus phalacroides Viguier, 1886, syn. Iospilus litoralis, Phalacrophorus niger

Lopadorrhynchidae 
Family Lopadorrhynchidae
 Genus Lopadorrhynchus
 Lopadorrhynchus krohnii  Claparede, 1870, syn. Hydrophanes krohnii, Lopadorhynchus krohni, Lopadorrhynchus krohnii simplex, Lopadorrhynchus viguieri
 Genus Maupasia
 Maupasia coeca  Viguier, 1886, syn. Maupasia caeca
 Maupasia gracilis  (Reibisch, 1893), syn. Haliplanella pacifica, Haliplanes magna, Halyplanes gracilis
 Genus Prolopadorrhynchus
 Prolopadorrhynchus appendiculatus  Southern, 1909, syn. Lopadorhynchus appendiculatus, Lopadorrhynchus appendiculatus
 Prolopadorrhynchus henseni  Reibisch, 1895, syn. Lopadorhynchus henseni, Lopadorrhynchus henseni
 Prolopadorrhynchus nationalis  Reibisch, 1895, syn. Lopadorhynchus nationalis, Lopadorrhynchus nans
 Genus Pelagobia
 Pelagobia longicirrata  Greef, 1879, syn. Pelagobia erinensis, Pelagobia viguieri

Nereidae 
Family Nereidae
 Genus Alitta
 Alitta succinea (Leuckart, 1847), syn. Neanthes oxypoda, Neanthes perrieri, Neanthes succinea, Nereis (Alitta) oxypoda, Nereis (Neanthes) australis, Nereis (Neanthes) saltonin, Nereis (Neanthes) succinea, Nereis acutifolia, Nereis alatopalpis, Nereis belawanensis, Nereis glandulosa, Nereis limbata, Nereis reibischi, Nereis succinea, 	
 Genus Ceratonereis
 Ceratonereis hircinicola (Eisig, 1870), syn. Ceratonereis hircinicola, Nereis (Ceratonereis) bartletti, Nereis (Ceratonereis) ehlersiana, Nereis (Ceratonereis) kinbergiana, Nereis hircinicola	
 Ceratonereis keiskama (Day, 1953), syn. Ceratonereis keiskama, endemic
 Genus Dendronereis
 Dendronereis arborifera Peters, 1854
 Genus Dendronereides
 Dendronereides zululandica Day, 1951
 Genus Laeonereis
 Laeonereis ankyloseta Day, 1957
 Genus Micronereides
 Micronereides capensis Day, 1963, endemic
 Genus Namanereis
 Namanereis quadraticeps Blanchard in Gay, 1849, syn. Lycastis quadraticeps
 Genus Namalycastis
 Namalycastis indica (Southern, 1921), syn. Lycastis indica
 Genus Neanthes
 Neanthes agulhana (Day, 1963), syn. Nereis (Neanthes) agulhana
 Neanthes papillosa (Day, 1963), syn. Nereis (Neanthes) papillosa, endemic
 Neanthes willeyi (Day, 1934), syn. Neanthes capensis, Nereis (Neanthes) willeyi, Nereis willeyi
 Genus Nereis
 Nereis caudata Delle Chiaje, 1841, syn. Nereis acuminata
 Nereis coutieri Gravier, 1899, syn. Nereis coutierei
 Nereis eugeniae (Kinberg, 1866)		
 Nereis falcaria (Willey, 1905), syn. Ceratonereis falcaria, Nereis kauderni
 Nereis falsa Quatrefages, 1866, syn. Nereis (Nereilepas) parallelogramma, Nereis lucipeta
 Nereis fusifera Quatrefages, 1866, endemic
 Nereis gilchristi Day, 1967, syn. Nereis gilchristi
 Nereis jacksoni Kinberg, 1866, syn. Nereis heirissonensis 	
 Nereis lamellosa Ehlers, 1864
 Nereis pelagica Linnaeus, 1758, syn. Heteronereis arctica, Heteronereis assimilis, Heteronereis grandifolia, Heteronereis migratoria, Nereilepas fusca, Nereis bowerbanckii, Nereis denticulata, Nereis ferruginea, Nereis fimbriata, Nereis fulgens, Nereis grandifolia, Nereis renalis, Nereis reynaudi, Nereis subulicola, Nereis verrucosa
 Nereis persica Fauvel, 1911, syn. Nereis longiqua, Nereis zonata persica
 Genus Perinereis
 Perinereis capensis (Kinberg, 1866), syn. Arete capensis
 Perinereis cultrifera (Grube, 1840), syn. Lycoris lobulata, Nereis beaucoudrayi, Nereis cultrifera, Nereis incerta, Nereis margaritacea, Perinereis hedenborgi, Spio ventilabrum
 Perinereis falsovariegata Monro, 1933
 Perinereis nuntia (Grube, 1857)		
 Genus Platynereis
 Platynereis australis (Schmarda, 1861), syn. Heteronereis australis	
 Platynereis calodonta Kinberg, 1866, syn. Nereis (Platynereis) hewitti endemic
 Platynereis dumerilii (Audouin & Milne Edwards, 1834), syn. Eunereis africana, Heteronereis fucicola, Heteronereis maculata, Heteronereis malmgreni, Leptonereis maculata, Mastigonereis quadridentata, Mastigonereis striata, Nereilepas variabilis, Nereis (Platynereis) dumerilii, Nereis agilis, Nereis alacris, Nereis antillensis, Nereis dumerilii, Nereis glasiovi, Nereis gracilis, Nereis megodon, Nereis peritonealis, Nereis taurica, Nereis zostericola, Platynereis dumerili, Platynereis jucunda, Uncinereis lutea, Uncinereis trimaculosa
 Genus Pseudonereis
 Pseudonereis variegata (Grube, 1857), syn. Mastigonereis longicirra, Mastigonereis podocirra, Nereilepas variegata, Nereis (Nereilepas) stimpsonis, Nereis coerulea, Nereis ferox, Nereis mendax, Nereis microphthalma, Nereis obscura, Nereis variegata, Paranereis elegans, Perinereis diversidentata, Perinereis variegata, Phyllonereis benedenii
 Genus Simplisetia
 Simplisetia erythraeensis (Fauvel, 1918), syn. Ceratonereis (Simplisetia) erythraeensis, Ceratonereis erythraeensis

Paralacydonidae 
Family Paralacydonidae
 Genus Paralacydonia
 Paralacydonia paradoxa Fauvel, 1913

Pholoidae 
Family Pholoidae
 Genus Pholoe
 Pholoe minuta (Fabricius, 1780), syn. Aphrodita minuta Fabricius, Palmyra ocellata, Pholoe eximia Johnston, Pholoe minuta eximia Johnson, Pholoe synophthalmica dinardensis, Polynoe minuta, Sigalion ocellatum
 Genus Pholoides
 Pholoides dorsipapillatus (Marenzeller, 1893), syn. Peisidice bermudensis, Pholoe dorsipapillata, Pholoides bermudensis

Phyllodocidae 
Family Phyllodocidae
 Genus Eteone
 Eteone siphodonta Delle Chiaje, 1830
 Genus Eulalia
 Eulalia bilineata (Johnston, 1840), syn. Eulalia bilineata, Eulalia fusca, Eulalia gracilis, Eulalia problema, Eulalia quadrilineata, Phyllodoce bilineata
 Eulalia trilineata de Saint-Joseph, 1888
 Genus Eumida
 Eumida sanguinea (Örsted, 1843), syn. Eulalia (Eumida) pallida, Eulalia flavescens, Eulalia granulosa, Eulalia pistacia, Eulalia sanguinea, Eumida communis, Eumida maculosa, Eumidia americana 
 Genus Hypereteone
 Hypereteone foliosa (Quatrefages, 1865), syn. Eteone foliosa
 Genus Nereiphylla
 Nereiphylla castanea (Marenzeller, 1879), syn. Carobia castanea, Genetyllis castanea, Phyllodoce castanea
 Genus Notophyllum
 Notophyllum splendens (Schmarda, 1861), syn. Macrophyllum leucopterum, Macrophyllum splendens, Notophyllum laciniatum
 Genus Protomystides
 Protomystides capensis Day, 1960, endemic
 Genus Phyllodoce
 Phyllodoce capensis Day, 1960, endemic
 Phyllodoce longipes Kinberg, 1866, syn. Anaitides longipes, Paranaitis jeffreysii
 Phyllodoce madeirensis Langerhans, 1880, syn. Anaitides madeirensis, Phyllodoce (Anaitides) africana, Phyllodoce (Anaitides) madeirensis
 Phyllodoce tubicola Day, 1963, endemic
 Phyllodoce schmardaei Day, 1963, syn. Phyllodoce macrophthalma
 Genus Sige
 Sige falsa (Day, 1960), syn. Eulalia (Sige) falsa, endemic
 Sige macroceros (Grube, 1860), syn. Eulalia (Pterocirrus) velifera, Eulalia macroceros, Eulalia volucris, Phyllodoce (Eulalia) macroceros
 Genus Steggoa
 Steggoa capensis (Schmarda, 1861), syn. Eulalia capensis, Eulalia viridis capensis

Pilargidae 
Family Pilargidae
 Genus Paracabira
 Paracabira capensis (Day, 1963), syn. Loandalia capensis, Parandalia capensis, endemic
 Genus Sigambra
 Sigambra constricta (Southern, 1921), syn. Ancistrosyllis constricta
 Sigambra parva (Day, 1963), syn. Ancistrosyllis parva	
 Genus Synelmis
 Synelmis rigida (Fauvel, 1919), syn. Ancistrosyllis rigida, Kynephorus inermis

Polynoidae 
Family Polynoidae
 Genus Alentia
 Alentia australis (Monro, 1936), syn. Hololepida australis
 Genus Antinoe
 Antinoe aequiseta Kinberg, 1856, syn. Antinoe aequiseta, Harmothoe aequiseta
 Antinoe epitoca Monro, 1930
 Antinoe lactea Day, 1953, endemic
 Genus Drieschia
 Drieschia pelagica Michaelsen, 1892, syn. Drieschia caroli, Nectochaeta caroli
 Genus Eunoe
 Eunoe assimilis McIntosh, 1924, endemic
 Eunoe hubrechti (McIntosh, 1900), syn. Harmothoe hubrechti
 Eunoe macrophthalma McIntosh, 1924, endemic
 Eunoe nodulosa Day, 1967, endemic
 Genus Euphione
 Euphione elisabethae McIntosh, 1885, endemic
 Genus Gorgoniapolynoe
 Gorgoniapolynoe corralophila (Day, 1960), syn. Harmothoe corralophila, endemic
 Genus Halosydna
 Halosydna alleni Day, 1934, syn. Halosydna (Hyperhalosydna) alleni, Halosydna alleni, Halosydnella alleni, endemic
 Genus Harmothoe
 Harmothoe africana Augener, 1918, syn. Harmothoe aequiseta africana
 Harmothoe antilopes McIntosh, 1876, syn. Evarne mazeli, Harmothoe antilopis	
 Harmothoe dictyophora (Grube, 1878), syn. Parmenis reticulata, Polynoe dictyophora, Polynoe dictyophorus
 Harmothoe fraserthomsoni McIntosh, 1897, syn. Lagisca fraserthomsoni
 Harmothoe gilchristi Day, 1960, syn. Harmothoe gilcristi
 Harmothoe goreensis Augener, 1918, syn. Harmothoe (Harmothoe) goreensis
 Harmothoe profunda Day, 1963, endemic
 Harmothoe saldanha Day, 1953, endemic
 Harmothoe serrata Day, 1963, syn. Harmothoe lagiscoides serrata, Harmothoe notochaetosa
 Harmothoe waahli (Kinberg, 1856), syn. Harmothoe (Lagisca) waahli, Antinoe waahli, Polynoe mytilicola	
 Genus Hemilepidia
 Hemilepidia erythrotaenia Schmarda, 1861, syn. Eunoe capensis
 Genus Lepidasthenia
 Lepidasthenia brunnea Day, 1960
 Lepidasthenia elegans (Grube, 1840), syn. Lepidasthenia affinis, Polynoe blainvillei, Polynoe elegans, Polynoe lamprophthalma
 Lepidasthenia microlepis Potts, 1910		
 Genus Lepidonotus
 Lepidonotus durbanensis Day, 1934
 Lepidonotus glaucus (Peters, 1854), syn. Lepidonotus carinatus, Lepidonotus grisea, Lepidonotus platycirrus, Polynoe glauca, Polynoe grisea	
 Lepidonotus magnatuberculata Seidler, 1923
 Lepidonotus semitectus (Stimpson, 1856), syn. Hermadion trochiscophora, Lepidonote semitecta, Lepidonotus wahlbergi, Polynoe trochiscophora, endemic
 Lepidonotus tenuisetosus (Gravier, 1902), syn. Euphione tenuisetosa, Lepidonotus natalensis
 Genus Macellicephala
 Macellicephala mirabilis (McIntosh, 1885), syn. Macellicephala (Macellicephala) mirabilis, Polynoe (Macellicephala) mirabilis
 Genus Malmgreniella
 Malmgreniella agulhana (Day, 1960), syn. Harmothoe agulhana endemic
 Malmgreniella capensis (McIntosh, 1885), syn. Malmgrenia purpurea, Parahalosydna capensis, Polynoe capensis, endemic
 Malmgreniella lunulata (Delle Chiaje, 1830), syn. Harmothoe (Harmothoe) lunulata, Harmothoe lunulata, Harmothoe lunulata pacifica, Malmgrenia lunulata, Monoclea tesselata, Polynoa maculosa, Polynoe lunulata, Polynoe maculosa
 Genus Polyeunoa
 Polyeunoa laevis McIntosh, 1885, syn. Enipo rhombigera, Eunoe agnae, Polyeunoa parvis, Polyeunoa rhombigera, Polyeunoe dubia, Polynoe agnae, Polynoe caputleonis, Polynoe thouarellicola
 Genus Polynoe
 Polynoe scolopendrina Savigny, 1822, syn. Lepidonotus ornatus, Parapolynoe sevastopolica, Polynoe attenuata, Polynoe crassipalpa, Polynoe johnstoni, Polynoe variegata
 Genus Subadyte
 Subadyte pellucida (Ehlers, 1864), syn. Adyte pellucida, Eumolphe fragilis, Hermadion fragile, Hermadion fugax, Hermadion pellucidum, Hermadion sabatieri, Pholoe brevicornis, Polynoe pellucida, Scalisetosus fragilis, Scalisetosus pellucidus

Pontodoridae 
Family Pontodoridae
 Genus Pontodora
 Pontodora pelagica Greeff, 1879, syn. Epitoka pelagica

Sigalionidae 
Family Sigalionidae
 Genus Euthalenessa
 Euthalenessa oculata (Peters, 1854), syn. Euthalenessa dendrolepis, Euthalenessa insignis, Leanira giardi, Sigalion oculatum, Thalenessa oculata
 Genus Fimbriosthenelais
 Fimbriosthenelais zetlandica (McIntosh, 1876), syn. Sthenelais papillosa, Sthenelais sarsi, Sthenelais vachoni, Sthenelais zetlandica
 Genus Heteropelogenia
 Heteropelogenia articulata (Day, 1960), syn. Psammolyce articulata, endemic
 Genus Leanira
 Leanira hystricis Ehlers, 1874
 Genus Neoleanira
 Neoleanira tetragona (Örsted, 1845), syn. Leanira tetragona, Sigalion buskii, Sigalion tetragonum, Sthenolepis tetragona
 Genus Pisione
 Pisione africana Day, 1963, endemic
 Genus Pisionidens
 Pisionidens indica Aiyar and Alikunhi 1940, syn. Fauveliella pulchra, Pisionella indica
 Genus Sigalion
 Sigalion capensis Day, 1960, syn. Sigalion capense, endemic
 Sigalion squamosus Delle Chiaje 1830, syn. Sigalion squamatum, Sigalion squamosum
 Genus Sthenelais
 Sthenelais boa (Johnston, 1833), syn. Sigalion boa Johnston, Sigalion estellae, Sigalion idunae, Sthenelais audouini Quatrefages, Sthenelais ctenolepis, Sthenelais edwardsii, Sthenelais fuliginosa, Sthenelais fuliginosa capensis
 Sthenelais limicola (Ehlers, 1864), syn. Aphrodita arcta, Sigalion limicola, Sthenelais leiolepis
 Genus Sthenelanella
 Sthenelanella ehlersi (Horst, 1916), syn. Euleanira ehlersi

Sphaerodoridae 
Family Sphaerodoridae
 Genus Sphaerodoropsis
 Sphaerodoropsis benguellarum (Day, 1963), syn. Sphaerodoridium benguellarum, Sphaerodorum benguellarum, endemic
 Sphaerodoropsis capense (Day, 1963), syn. Sphaerodoridium capense, Sphaerodorum capense, endemic
 Genus Sphaerodorum
 Sphaerodorum gracile (Rathke, 1843)

Syllidae 
Family Syllidae 
 Genus Amblyosyllis
 Amblyosyllis formosa (Claparède, 1863), syn. Amblyosillis algefnae, Amblyosillis plectorhyncha, Amblyosyllis algefnae, Amblyosyllis dorsigera, Amblyosyllis inmatura, Amblyosyllis inmaturata, Amblyosyllis lineata, Gattiola spectabilis, Pterosyllis dorsigera, Pterosyllis formosa, Pterosyllis plectorhyncha, Thylaciphorus hessii 
 Genus Anguillosyllis
 Anguillosyllis capensis Day, 1963, endemic
 Genus Autolytus
 Autolytus bondei Day, 1934, endemic
 Autolytus maclearanus McIntosh, 1885, syn. Autolytus gibber
 Autolytus tuberculatus (Schmarda, 1861), syn. Cirrosyllis tuberculata, endemic
 Genus Branchiosyllis
 Branchiosyllis exilis (Gravier, 1900), syn. Branchiosyllis uncinigera, Syllis (Typosyllis) cirropunctata, Syllis (Typosyllis) exilis, Syllis cirropunctata, Syllis exilis, Syllis solida, Trypanosyllis uncinigera, Typosyllis cirropunctata, Typosyllis exilis
 Genus Brania
 Brania furcelligera Augener, 1913, syn. Grubea furcelligera
 Brania rhopalophora (Ehlers, 1897), syn. Grubea rhopalophora
 Genus Epigamia
 Epigamia charcoti (Gravier, 1906), syn. Autolytus (Regulatus) charcoti, Autolytus afer, Autolytus charcoti
 Genus Erinaceusyllis
 Erinaceusyllis erinaceus (Claparède, 1863), syn. Sphaerosyllis (Sphaerosyllis) erinaceus, Sphaerosyllis brevifrons, Sphaerosyllis erinaceus
 Genus Eusyllis
 Eusyllis assimilis Marenzeller, 1875, syn. Eusyllis monilicornis
 Genus Exogone
 Exogone clavator Ehlers, 1913, endemic
 Exogone naidina Örsted, 1845, syn. Exogone gemmifera, Exogone kefersteinii, Exogone naidina, Gossia longiseta, Paedophylax levis, Schmardia chauseyana	
 Exogone normalis Day, 1963, endemic
 Exogone verugera (Claparède, 1868), syn. Paedophylex veruger,  Exogone veruger
 Genus Exogonoides
 Exogonoides antennata Day, 1963, endemic
 Genus Haplosyllis
 Haplosyllis spongicola (Grube, 1855), syn. Haplosyllis (Syllis) hamata, Haplosyllis cephalata,  Haplosyllis gula, Haplosyllis hamata, Haplosyllis maderensis, Haplosyllis oligachaete, Haplosyllis palpata, Haplosyllis spongicola tentaculata, Haplosyllis spongicola var. spongicola, Hemisyllis dispar, Nereis teticola, Syllis (Haplosyllis) djiboutiensis, Syllis (Haplosyllis) hamata, Syllis (Haplosyllis) spongicola, Syllis hamata, Syllis oligochaeta, Syllis setubalensis, Syllis spongicola, Syllis spongicola, Syllis streptocephala	
 Haplosyllis trifalcata (Day, 1960), syn. Syllis (Haplosyllis) trifalcata, endemic
 Genus Irmula
 Irmula spissipes Ehlers, 1913
 Genus Lamellisyllis
 Lamellisyllis comans Day, 1960, endemic
 Genus Langerhansia
 Langerhansia anops (Ehlers, 1897), syn. Syllis (Ehlersia) anops
 Genus Myrianida
 Myrianida phyllocera Augener, 1918
 Myrianida prolifera (O.F. Müller, 1788), syn. Autolytus agassizii, Autolytus ehbiensis, Autolytus hesperidum, Autolytus prolifer, Autolytus prolifera, Crithida prolifera, Nereis prolifera, Polybostrichus mulleri
 Myrianida pulchella Day, 1953, endemic
 Genus Odontosyllis
 Odontosyllis polycera (Schmarda, 1861), syn. Odontosyllis suteri, Syllis polycera, Trypanosyllis occipitalis
 Genus Opisthosyllis
 Opisthosyllis brunnea Langerhans, 1879
 Genus Paraehlersia
 Paraehlersia ferrugina (Langerhans, 1881), syn. Ehlersia ferrugina, Ehlersia ferruginea, Langerhansia ferrugina, Syllis (Ehlersia) ferrugina, Syllis (Ehlersia) ferruginea, Syllis (Langerhansia) ferrugina, Syllis (Langerhansia) ferrugina, Syllis ferrugina, Syllis ferruginea, Typosyllis (Ehlersia) ferruginea, Typosyllis (Langerhansia) ferrugina, Typosyllis (Langerhansia) ferruginea	
 Genus Pharyngeovalvata
 Pharyngeovalvata natalensis Day, 1951, endemic
 Genus Pionosyllis
 Pionosyllis ehlersiaeformis Augener, 1913
 Pionosyllis longocirrata Saint Joseph, 1887, syn. Parapionosyllis longocirrata, Pionosyllis morenoae
 Pionosyllis magnidens Day, 1953, endemic
 Pionosyllis malmgreni McIntosh, 1869
 Genus Proceraea
 Proceraea picta Ehlers, 1864, syn. Autolytus (Proceraea) picta, Autolytus pictus, Myrianida picta, Procerea scupularis
 Genus Procerastea
 Procerastea nematodes Langerhans, 1884, syn. Procerastea perieri, Procerastea perrieri
 Genus Spermosyllis
 Spermosyllis capensis Day, 1953, endemic
 Genus Sphaerosyllis
 Sphaerosyllis capensis Day, 1953, syn. Sphaerosyllis hystrix capensis
 Sphaerosyllis semiverrucosa Ehlers, 1913, endemic
 Sphaerosyllis sublaevis Ehlers, 1913, endemic
 Genus Syllides
 Syllides longocirratus (Örsted, 1845), syn. Syllides longicirrata, Syllides longocirrata, Syllis (Syllides) longocirrata, Syllis longicirrata, Syllis longocirrata
 Genus Syllis
 Syllis amica Quatrefages, 1866, syn. Ehlersia (Syllis) simplex, Ehlersia simplex, Syllis (Ehlersia) aesthetica, Syllis (Ehlersia) simplex, Syllis (Typosyllis) amica, Syllis aesthetica, Syllis cunninghami, Typosyllis (Syllis) amica, Typosyllis amica
 Syllis armillaris (O.F. Müller, 1776), syn. Ioda macrophthalma, Ioida macrophthalma, Ioida macrophthalmus, Lycastis armillaris, Nereis armillaris, Nereisyllis ornata, Pionosyllis alternosetosa, Syllis (Typosyllis) alternosetosa, Syllis (Typosyllis) armillaris, Syllis (Typosyllis) capensis, Syllis (Typosyllis) tortugaensis, Syllis alternosetosa, Syllis brachychaeta, Syllis capensis, Syllis closterobranchia, Syllis crassicornis, Syllis danica, Syllis lineata, Syllis macrophthalma, Syllis syllisformis, Syllis tigrina, Syllis tortugaensis, Trichosyllis sylliformis, Trichosyllis syllisformis, Typosyllis (Syllis) armillaris, Typosyllis (Syllis) capensis, Typosyllis (Typosyllis) armillaris, Typosyllis armillaris, Typosyllis brachychaeta, Typosyllis capensis, Typosyllis closterobranchia, Typosyllis tortugaensis
 Syllis cornuta Rathke, 1843, syn. Ehlersia (Syllis) cornuta, Ehlersia cornuta, Langerhansia cornuta, Langerhansia cornuta hystricis, Syllis (Ehlersia) cornuta, Syllis (Langerhansia) cornuta, Syllis (Typosyllis) cornuta, Syllis (Typosyllis) harti, Syllis cornuta collingsii, Syllis fabricii, Syllis pallida, Typosyllis (Ehlersia) cornuta, Typosyllis (Langerhansia) cornuta, Typosyllis cornuta
 Syllis gracilis Grube, 1840,syn. Syllis (Syllis) gracilis, Syllis (Syllis) longissima, Syllis brachycirris, Syllis longissima, Syllis mixtosetosa, Syllis navicellidens, Syllis nigrovittata, Syllis nigro-vittata, Syllis palifica, Syllis quadridentata, Syllis vancaurica
 Syllis hyalina Grube, 1863, syn. Pionosyllis hyalina, Syllis (Typosyllis) hyalin, Syllis (Typosyllis) hyalina, Syllis (Typosyllis) melanopharyngea, Syllis (Typosyllis) tristanensis, Syllis borealis, Syllis hialina, Syllis macrocola, Syllis pellucida, Syllis simillima, Syllis velox, Typosyllis (Syllis) hyalina, Typosyllis (Syllis) velox, Typosyllis (Typosyllis) hyalina, Typosyllis aciculata orientalis, Typosyllis hyalina, Typosyllis melanopharyngea, Typosyllis orientalis, Typosyllis tristanensis	
 Syllis prolifera Krohn, 1852, syn. Gnathosyllis zonata, Pionosyllis prolifera, Syllis (Typosyllis) bouvieri, Syllis (Typosyllis) prolifera, Syllis (Typosyllis) zonata, Syllis armandi, Syllis bouvieri, Syllis fiumensis, Syllis fluminensis, Syllis lussinensis, Syllis nigrans, Syllis zonata, Typosyllis (Syllis) nigrans, Typosyllis (Syllis) prolifera, Typosyllis (Typosyllis) prolifera, Typosyllis bouvieri, Typosyllis nigrans, Typosyllis prolifera, Typosyllis zonata
 Syllis variegata Grube, 1860, syn. Isosyllis armoricana, Syllis (Typosyllis) variegata, Syllis (Typosyllis) variegata variegata, Syllis armoricana, Syllis aurantiaca, Syllis hexagonifera, Syllis nigropunctata, Syllis oblonga, Syllis schmardian, Syllis variegata profunda, Syllis variegata variegata, Syllis varlegata, Thoe fusiformis, Typosyllis (Syllis) aurantiaca, Typosyllis (Syllis) variegata, Typosyllis (Typosyllis) variegata, Typosyllis armoricana, Typosyllis aurantiaca, Typosyllis cirromaculata, Typosyllis variegata', 'Typosyllis variegata profunda	
 Syllis vittata Grube, 1840, syn. Syllis (Typosyllis) vittata, Syllis aurita, Syllis buskii, Syllis nigropharyngea, Typosyllis (Syllis) vittata, Typosyllis (Typosyllis) vittata, Typosyllis vitatta, Typosyllis vittata
 Genus Trypanosyllis
 Trypanosyllis aeolis Langerhans, 1879, syn. Trypanosyllis (Trypanedenta) gemmipara, Trypanosyllis gemmipara
 Trypanosyllis ankyloseta Day, 1960, endemic
 Trypanosyllis gemmulifera Augener, 1918
 Trypanosyllis prampramensis Augener, 1918
 Trypanosyllis zebra (Grube, 1840), syn. Syllis rubra, Syllis zebra, Trypanosyllis krohnii
 Genus Typosyllis	
 Typosyllis benguellana (Day, 1963), syn. Syllis benguellana, endemic

Tomopteridae 
Family Tomopteridae
 Genus Enapteris
 Enapteris euchaeta Chun, 1888, syn. Tomopteris euchaeta
 Genus Tomopteris
 Tomopteris cavalli Rosa, 1908
 Tomopteris dunckeri Rosa, 1908, syn. Tomopteris dunckeri, Tomopteris membranacea
 Tomopteris helgolandica (Greeff, 1879)
 Tomopteris krampi Wesenberg-Lund, 1936
 Tomopteris ligulata Rosa, 1908
 Tomopteris nationalis Apstein, 1900
 Tomopteris pacifica (Izuka, 1914), syn. Tomopteris elegans, Tomopteris kefersteini, Tomopteris pacifica, Tomopteris renata
 Tomopteris planktonis Apstein, 1900	
 Tomopteris septentrionalis Steenstrup, 1849, syn. Tomopteris eschscholtzii

Typhloscolecidae 
Family Typhloscolecidae
 Genus Sagitella
 Sagitella kowalewskii  Wagner, 1872, syn. Acicularia virchowii, Plotobia paucichaeta, Sagitella kowalevskii, Sagitella kowalevskyi, Sagitella kowalewski, Typhloscolex paucichaeta
 Genus Travisiopsis
 Travisiopsis lanceolata  Southern, 1910, syn. Plotobia simplex, Sagitella cornuta, Travisiopsis atlantica
 Travisiopsis dubia  Støp-Bowitz, 1948
 Genus Typhloscolex
 Typhloscolex muelleri  Busch, 1851

Nephtyidae 
Family Nephtyidae
 Genus Aglaophamus
 Aglaophamus dibranchis (Grube, 1877), syn. Nephthys dibranchis, Nephthys mirasetis, Nephtys dibranchis
 Aglaophamus macroura Schmarda 1861, syn. Nephtys macroura
 Genus Micronephthys
 Micronephthys sphaerocirrata (Wesenberg-Lund, 1949), syn. Nephthys sphaerocirrata, Nephtys sphaerocirrata
 Genus Nephtys
 Nephtys capensis Day, 1953, endemic
 Nephtys hombergii Savigny in Lamarck, 1818, syn. Nephthys ehlersi, Nephthys hombergi, Nephthys langerhansi, Nephthys macandrewi, Nephthys maeotica, Nephthys neapolitana, Nereis scolopendriodes
 Nephtys tulearensis  Fauvel, 1919, syn. Nephthys tulearensis

Sabellida 
Order Sabellida

Fabriciidae 
Family Fabriciidae
 Genus Fabricia
 Fabricia bansei  Day, 1961, endemic
 Fabricia capensis  Monro, 1937, endemic
 Genus Pseudofabriciola
 Pseudofabriciola filamentosa  Day, 1963, syn. Fabricia filamentosa, endemic

Oweniidae 
Family Oweniidae
 Genus Owenia
 Owenia fusiformis  Delle Chiaje, 1844, syn. Ammochares aedificator, Ammochares assimilis, Ammochares brasiliensis, Ammochares occidentale, Ammochares orientalis, Ammochares ottonis, Ammochares sundevalli, Ammochares tegula, Ammochares tenuis, Ops digitata, Owenia brachycera, Owenia filiformis

Sabellariidae 
Family Sabellariidae
 Genus Gesaia
 Gesaia elegans (Fauvel, 1911), syn. Phalacrostemma elegans
 Genus Gunnarea
 Gunnarea gaimardi   (Quatrefages, 1848), syn. Gunnarea capensis, Hermella capensis, Pallasia gaimardi, Sabellaria capensis, endemic
 Genus Idanthyrsus
 Idanthyrsus pennatus  (Peters, 1854), syn. Crytopomatus geayi, Pallasia pennata, Sabellaria (Pallasia) pennata
 Genus Lygdamis
 Lygdamis gilchristi   (McIntosh, 1924), syn. Lygdamis muratus gilchristi, Tetreres murata gilchristi, endemic
 Lygdamis indicus  Kinberg, 1866
 Genus Sabellaria
 Sabellaria pectinata Fauvel, 1932, syn. Sabellaria pectinata intermedia
 Sabellaria intoshi Fauvel, 1914, syn. Sabellaria spinulosa gravieri, Sabellaria spinulosa intoshi
 Sabellaria alcocki  Gravier 1906, syn. Sabellaria spinulosa alcocki

Sabellidae 
Family Sabellidae
 Genus Amphiglena
 Amphiglena mediterranea (Leydig, 1851), syn. Amphicora mediterranea, Amphicorina desiderata
 Genus Branchiomma
 Branchiomma capensis McIntosh 1885, syn. Dasychone argus capensis, endemic
 Branchiomma natalensis Kinberg, 1867, syn. Dasychone violacea, Sabella luxuriosa, Sabella natalensis
 Branchiomma nigromaculatum Baird 1865, syn. Bispira nigromaculata, Dasychone argus chefinae, Dasychone corollifera, Dasychone loandensis, Dasychone ponce, Sabella lynceus, Sabella nigromaculata, Dasychone nigromaculata, Branchiomma nigromaculata
 Branchiomma serratibranchis Grube 1878, syn. Sabella (Dasychone) serratibranchis
 Branchiomma violacea Schmarda, 1861, syn. Dasychone capensis, Dasychone foliosa, Dasychone violacea natalensis, Dasychone violacea, Sabella folifera
 Genus Chone
 Chone letterstedti Kinberg 1867, syn. Euchone letterstedi, Parachonia letterstedi, endemic
 Genus Desdemona
 Desdemona ornata Banse 1957
 Genus Euchone
 Euchone capensis Day 1961, endemic
 Euchone rosea Langerhans 1884
 Genus Fabricinuda
 Fabricinuda mossambica Day 1957, syn. Fabricia mossambica, Fabriciola mossambica
 Genus Hypsicomus
 Hypsicomus capensis Day, 1961, endemic
 Genus Jasmineira
 Jasmineira elegans Saint-Joseph 1894, syn. Jasmineira caducibranchiata
 Genus Megalomma
 Megalomma quadrioculatum (Willey, 1905)
 Genus Myxicola
 Myxicola infundibulum Renier 1804, syn. Amphitrite floscula, Amphitrite infundibulum, Eriographis borealis, Leiobranchus modestus, Myxicola affinis, Myxicola conjuncta, Myxicola grubii, Myxicola michaelseni, Myxicola modesta, Myxicola monacis, Myxicola, pacifica, Myxicola parasites, Myxicola platychaeta, Myxicola sarsii, Myxicola steenstrupi, Myxicola, villosa, Myxicola viridis, Sabella gelatinosa, Sabella villosa, Sabella viridis, Terebella buccinea, Terebella infundibulum, Tuba divisa
 Genus Oriopsis
 Oriopsis ehlersi Day 1961, endemic
 Oriopsis eimeri Langerhans 1880, syn. Oria eimera
 Oriopsis neglecta Banse 1957
 Oriopsis parvula Ehlers 1913, syn. Oria parvula, Oridia parvula, endemic
 Genus Paradialychone
 Paradialychone filicaudata Southern 1914, syn. Chone filicaudata
 Genus Potamilla
 Potamilla linguicollaris Day, 1961, endemic
 Potamilla torelli Malmgren, 186
 Genus Pseudopotamilla
 Pseudopotamilla reniformis (Bruguière, 1789), syn. Amphitrite reniformis, Potamilla obscura, Potamilla reniformis, Potamilla troncatula, Sabella aspera, Sabella oculata, Sabella reniformis
 Genus Sabella
 Sabella spallanzanii (Gmelin, 1791), syn. Corallina Tubularia-Melitensis, Sabella penicillus, Serpula penicillus, Spirographis spallanzanii
 Genus Sabellastarte
 Sabellastarte longa Kinberg 1867, syn. Dasychone odhneri, Sabella longa
 Sabellastarte sanctijosephi Gravier 1906, syn. Eurato sanctijosephi

Serpulidae 
Family Serpulidae
 Genus Ficopomatus
 Ficopomatus enigmatica Fauvel 1923, syn. Mercierella enigmatica, Phycopomatus enigmaticus
 Genus Filograna
 Filograna implexa Berkley 1835, syn. Filigrana implexa, Filigrana implexa sarsii, Filograna berkeleyi, Filograna schleideni, Serpula complexa, Serpula corallifica, Serpula filiformis, Serpula filograna, Tubipora filogranum, Tubipora ramosa
 Genus Hydroides
 Hydroides bifurcatus Pixell 1913, syn. Eupomatus bifurcatus, Hydroides bifurcata
 Hydroides dipoma Schmarda 1861, syn. Codonytes dipoma, Enpomatus dipoma, Eupomatus spinosus, Hydroides spinosus, Hydroides spinoza, Hydroides uncinatus macronyx
 Hydroides diramphus Mörch, 1863, syn. Eucarphus serratus, Eupomatus dirampha, Eupomatus lunifer, Eupomatus lunulifer, Hydroides (Eucarphus) benzoni, Hydroides (Eucarphus) cumingii, Hydroides (Eucarphus) dirampha, Hydroides benzoni, Hydroides cumingii, Hydroides lunulifera, Hydroides malleophorus, Hydroides serratus, Serpula (Hydroides) lunulifera, Vermilia benzonii, Vermilia cumingii, Vermilia dirampha
 Hydroides norvegicus Gunnerus 1768, syn. Eupomatus vermicularis, Hydroides nervegica, Sabella euplacana, Serpula (Eupomatus) pectinata, Serpula (Eupomatus) reversa, Serpula angulata, Serpula contortus, Serpula muelleri, Serpula norwegica, Serpula reversa, Serpula solitaria, Serpula vermicularis, Spirobis reversus, Vermilia incerta, Vermilia pectinata
 Genus Leodora
 Leodora laevis Quatrefages 1866, syn. Spirorbis laevis, Spirorbis (Laeospira) laevis
 Genus Neovermilia
 Neovermilia capensis Day 1961, endemic
 Genus Pomatoceros
 Pomatoceros caeruleus Schmarda 1861, syn. Pomatoceros coeruleus, Vermilia caerulea
 Genus Protolaeospira
 Protolaeospira capensis Day 1961, syn. Paralaeospira capensis, Protolaeospira capensis, Protolaeospira translucens
 Genus Protula
 Protula anomala Day 1955, syn. Protula tubularia anomala, endemic
 Protula bispiralis Savigny 1820, syn. Protula (Philippiprotula) magnifica, Protula magnifica, Serpula (Spiramella) bispiralis, Serpula bispiralis, Spiramella bispiralis
 Protula tubularia Montagu 1803, syn. Protula (Protula) tubularia, Protula (Protula) tuburalia, Protula (Psygmobranchus) protensa, Protula (Psygmobranchus) tubularia, Protula borealis, Protula capensis, Protula elegans, Protula meilhaci, Protula protensa, Protula rudolphi, Protula tabularia, Protula tubularia capensis, Protula tubularia tubularia, Psygmobranchus elegans, Psygmobranchus intermedius, Psygmobranchus pratensis, Psygmobranchus protensus, Psygmobranchus simplex, Psygmobranchus tubularis, Serpula arundo, Serpula tubularia
 Genus Pseudochitinopoma
 Pseudochitinopoma capensis Day 1961, syn. Chitinopoma capensis, Ficopomatus capensis, endemic
 Genus Pseudovermilia
 Pseudovermilia babylonia Day 1967, syn. Vermiliopsis babylonia
 Genus Serpula
 Serpula vermicularis Linnaeus 1767, syn. Serpula (Serpula) aspera, Serpula (Serpula) pallida, Serpula aspera, Serpula contortuplicata, Serpula crater, Serpula cristata, Serpula echinata, Serpula fascicularis, Serpula gervaisii, Serpula interrupta, Serpula montagui, Serpula pallida, Serpula philippi, Serpula proboscidea, Serpula rugosa, Serpula venusta, Serpula vermicularis echinata, Serpula vermicularis vermicularis, Vermilia vermicularis
 Genus Spirobranchus
 Spirobranchus giganteus Pallas 1766, syn. Cymospira bicornis, Cymospira cervina, Cymospira gigantea, Cymospira megasoma, Cymospira rubus, Olga elegantissima, Penicillum marinum, Pomatoceros oerstedi, Serpula (Cymospira) gigantea, Serpula (Galeolaria) gigantea, Serpula bicornis, Serpula gigantea, Spirobranchus (Cymospira) giganteus, Spirobranchus giganteus giganteus, Spirobranchus giganteus microceras, Spirobranchus giganteus tricornis, Spirobranchus megasoma, Spirobranchus tricornis, Terebella bicornis
 Spirobranchus kraussi Baird 1865, syn. Pomatoceros (Pomatoleios) caerulescens, Pomatoleios caerulescens, Pomatoleios crosslandi, Pomatoleios kraussii, Pomatoleios kraussii manilensis
 Genus Spirorbis
 Spirorbis foraminosus Bush 1905, syn. Spirorbis (Dexiospira) foraminosus
 Spirorbis patagonicus Caullery and Mesnil 1897	
 Genus Vermiliopsis
 Vermiliopsis glandigerus Gravier 1906, syn. Vermiliopsis glandigera, Vermiliopsis glandigerius

Spionida 
Order Spionida

Chaetopteridae 
Family Chaetopteridae
 Genus Chaetopterus
 Chaetopterus variopedatus (Renier, 1804), syn. Chaetopterus afer, Chaetopterus antarcticus, Chaetopterus appendiculatus, Chaetopterus australis, Chaetopterus brevis, Chaetopteruscorsslandi, Chaetopterus hamatus, Chaetopterus insignis, Chaetopterus kagosimensis, Chaetopterus leuckarti, Chaetopterus longimanus, Chaetopterus luteus, Chaetopterus norvegicus, Chaetopterus quatrefagesii, Chaetopterus sarsii, Chaetopterus valencinii, Chaetopterus varieopedatus, Chaetopterus variopedatus, Tricoelia variopedata
 Genus Mesochaetopterus
 Mesochaetopterus capensis (McIntosh, 1885), syn. Ranzania capensis
 Mesochaetopterus minutus Potts, 1914
 Genus Phyllochaetopterus
 Phyllochaetopterus elioti Crossland, 1903
 Phyllochaetopterus herdmani (Hornell in Willey, 1905), syn. Spiochaetopterus herdmani
 Pyhyllochatopterus socialis Claparède, 1869, syn. Mesotrocha sexoculata, Phyllochaetopterus fallax, Phyllochaetopterus pictus
 Genus Spiocheatopterus
 Spiocheatopterus costarum (Claparède, 1869), syn. Telepsavus bonhourei, Telepsavus costarum, Telepsavus vitrarius
 Spiochaetopterus typicus M. Sars, 1856

Magelonidae 
Family Magelonidae
 Genus Magelona
 Magelona capensis  Day, 1961
 Magelona cincta  Ehlers, 1908
 Magelona debeerei  Clarke, Paterson, Florence, Gibbons 2010, syn. Magelona papillicornis

Spionidae 
Family Spionidae 
 Genus Aonidella
 Aonidella cirrobranchiata (Day, 1961), syn. Minuspio cirrobranchiata, Prionospio cirrobranchiata
 Genus Aonides
 Aonides oxycephala (Sars, 1862), syn. Aonides auricularis, Nerine oxycephala 
 Genus Boccardia
 Boccardia polybranchia (Haswell, 1885), syn. Perialla claparedei, Polydora (Leucodore) polybranchia, Polydora euryhalina
 Boccardia pseudonatrix Day, 1961, endemic
 Genus Boccardiella
 Boccardiella ligerica (Ferronnière, 1898), syn. Boccardia ligerica, Boccardia redeki, Polydora (Boccardiella) ligerica, Polydora redeki
 Genus Dipolydora
 Dipolydora capensis (Day, 1955), syn. Polydora capensis, endemic
 Dipolydora coeca (Örsted, 1843), syn. Leipoceras uviferum, Leucodore coecum, Polydora (Polydora) coeca, Polydora caeca
 Dipolydora giardi (Mesnil, 1896), syn. Polydora (Polydora) giardi, Polydora giardi
 Dipolydora keulderae Simon 2011, endemic
 Dipolydora normalis (Day, 1957), syn. Polydora normalis
 Genus Dispio
 Dispio magnus Day 1955, syn. Spio magnus, Dispio magna, endemic
 Genus Laonice
 Laonice cirrata (M. Sars, 1851), syn. Aricidea alata, Aricideopsis megalops, Chaetosphaera falconis, Laonice pugettensis, Nerine cirrata, Scolecolepis cirrata, Spionides cirratus
 Genus Malacoceros
 Malacoceros indicus (Fauvel, 1928), syn. Scolecolepis indica
 Genus Paraprionospio
 Paraprionospio pinnata (Ehlers, 1901), syn. Paraprionospio tribranchiata, Prionospio (Paraprionospio) pinnata, Prionospio africana, Prionospio ornata, Prionospio pinnata
 Genus Polydora
 Polydora dinthwanyana Simon 2011, endemic
 Polydora flava Claparede, 1870, syn. Polydora dorsomaculata, Polydora pusilla
 Polydora hoplura Claparede, 1870, syn. Polydora hoplura hoplura
 Polydora maculata Day, 1963, endemic
 Genus Prionospio
 Prionospio cirrifera Wirén, 1883, syn. Laonice cirrata, Minuspio cirrifera
 Prionospio ehlersi Fauvel, 1928
 Prionospio malmgreni Claparède, 1869, syn. Prionospio bocki, Prionospio capensis
 Prionospio saldanha Day, 1961, syn. Apoprionospio saldanha
 Prionospio sexoculata Augener, 1918, syn. Aquilaspio sexoculata
 Prionospio steenstrupi Malmgren, 1867, syn. Prionospio (Prionospio) steenstrupi
 Genus Pseudopolydora
 Pseudopolydora antennata (Claparède, 1869), syn. Polydora (Pseudopolydora) antennata, Polydora antennata
 Pseudopolydora dayii Simon, 2009, endemic
 Genus Pygospio
 Pygospio elegans Claparède, 1863, syn. Pygospio minutus, Spio inversa, Spio rathbuni
 Genus Rhynchospio
 Rhynchospio glutaea Ehlers, 1897, syn. Rhynchospio arenincola, Rhynchospio arenincola asiatica, Scolecolepis cornifera, Scolecolepis glutaea
 Genus Scolelepis
 Scolelepis gilchristi (Day, 1961), syn. Nerinides gilchristi, Pseudomalacoceros gilchristi
 Scolelepis squamata (Muller, 1806), syn. Lumbricus cirratulus, Nereis foliata, Nerine agilis, Nerine capensis, Nerine cirratulus, Nerine cirratulus chilensis, Nerine heteropoda, Nerine minuta, Nerinides agilis, Nerinides goodbodyi, Scolelepis agilis
 Genus Spio
 Spio filicornis (Müller, 1776), syn. Nereis filicornis, Spio gattyi
 Genus Spiophanes
 Spiophanes bombyx (Claparède, 1870), syn. Spio bombyx, Spiophanes verrilli
 Spiophanes duplex (Chamberlin, 1919), syn. Spiophanes chilensis, Spiophanes missionensis, Spiophanes soderstromi, Spiophanes soederstroemi

Poecilochaetidae 
Family Poecilochaetidae
 Genus Poecilochaetus
 Poecilochaetus serpens  Allen, 1904

Terebellida 
Order Terebellida

Ampharetidae 
Family Ampharetidae
 Genus Ampharete
 Ampharete acutifrons (Grube, 1860), syn. Ampharete cirrata, Amphicteis acutifrons, Branchiosabella zostericola
 Ampharete agulhasensis (Day, 1961), syn. Lysippe agulhasensis, endemic
 Ampharete capensis (Day, 1961), syn. Lysippe capensis
 Genus Amphicteis
 Amphicteis gunneri (M. Sars, 1835), syn. Amphicteis curvipalea, Amphicteis groenlandica, Amphicteis gunneri japonica, Amphicteis japonica, Amphitrite gunneri, Crossostoma midas
 Genus Glyphanostomum
 Glyphanostomum abyssale Day, 1967
 Genus Isolda
 Isolda pulchella Müller in Grube, 1858, syn. Isolda sibogae, Isolda warnbroensis, Isolda whydahaensis
 Genus Melinna
 Melinna cristata (M. Sars, 1851), syn. Sabellides cristata
 Genus Melinnopsides
 Melinnopsides capensis (Day, 1955), syn. Melinnopsis capensis, endemic
 Genus Phyllocomus
 Phyllocomus hiltoni (Chamberlin, 1919), syn. Schistocomus hiltoni
 Genus Pterampharete
 Pterampharete leuderitzi Augener 1918, syn. Sabellides (Pterampharete) luderitzi
 Genus Sabellides
 Sabellides capensis Day, 1961
 Sabellides octocirrata (M. Sars, 1835), syn. Heterobranchus speciosus, Sabella octocirrata, Sabellides octocirrata mediterranea
 Genus Samythella
 Samythella affinis Day, 1963

Cirratulidae 
Family Cirratulidae
 Genus Aphelochaeta
 Aphelochaeta filiformis (Keferstein, 1862), syn. Cirratulus filicornis, Cirratulus filiformis, Cirratulus norvegicus, Cirratulus tesselatus
 Aphelochaeta marioni (Saint-Joseph, 1894), syn. Heterocirrus marioni, Tharyx marioni
 Genus Caulleriella
 Caulleriella acicula Day, 1961, endemic
 Caulleriella capensis (Monro, 1930), syn. Caulleriella afra, Dodecaceria afra, Heterocirrus caputesocis capensis, endemic
 Genus Chaetozone
 Chaetozone setosa Malmgren, 1867, syn. Cirratulus longisetis
 Genus Cirratulus
 Cirratulus concinnus Ehlers, 1908, endemic	
 Cirratulus gilchristi Day, 1961, endemic
 Genus Cirriformia
 Cirriformia capensis (Schmarda, 1861), syn. Cirratulus australis, Cirratulus capensis
 Cirriformia chrysoderma (Claparède, 1869), syn. Audouinia chrysoderma, Cirratulus chrysoderma
 Cirriformia filigera (Delle Chiaje, 1828), syn. Audouinia filigera, Audouinia oculata, Audouinia pygidia, Cirratulus australis, Cirratulus chiajei, Cirratulus cincinnatus, Lumbricus filigerus
 Cirriformia punctata Grube, 1859, syn. Cirratulus multicirratus, Cirratulus niger, Cirratulus nigromaculatus, Cirrhatulus punctatus
 Cirriformia tentaculata (Montagu, 1808), syn. Cirratulus atrocollaris, Cirratulus borealis, Cirratulus comosus, Cirratulus lamarckii, Terebella tentaculata
 Genus Dodecaceria
 Dodecaceria capensis Day, 1961
 Dodecaceria laddi Hartman, 1954		
 Dodecaceria pulchra Day, 1955		
 Genus Monticellina	
 Monticellina dorsobranchialis (Kirkegaard, 1959), syn. Cirratulus dorsobranchialis, Tharyx dorsobranchialis
 Genus Tharyx
 Tharyx annulosus Hartman, 1965, syn. Zeppelina prolonga
 Tharyx filibranchia Day, 1961, endemic

Flabelligeridae 
Family Flabelligeridae
 Genus Brada
 Brada capensis Day 1961
 Genus Daylithos
 Daylithos parmata (Grube, 1877), syn. Pherusa parmata, Stylariodes parmata, Stylariodes parmatus
 Genus Diplocirrus
 Diplocirrus capensis Day, 1961
 Genus Flabelligera
 Flabelligera affinis M. Sars, 1829, syn. Amphitrite plumosa, Chloraema dujardinii, Chloraema edwardsii, Chloraema pellucidum, Chloraema sordidum, Flabelligera claparedii, Flabelligera marenzelleri, Pherusa tetragona, Siphonostoma affine, Siphonostoma buskii, Siphonostoma gelatinosa, Siphonostoma vaginiferum, Siphostoma uncinata, Tecturella flaccida, Tecturella luctator
 Genus Pherusa
 Pherusa laevis (Stimpson, 1856), syn. Siphonostoma laeve, Stylarioides laevis, Trophonia xanthotricha, endemic
 Pherusa monroi (Day, 1957), syn. Stylarioides monroi
 Pherusa saldanha Day, 1961, endemic
 Pherusa swakopiana (Augener, 1918), syn. Stylarioides swakopianus
 Genus Piromis
 Piromis arenosus Kinberg, 1866, syn. Piromis capensis, Pycnoderma fernandense, Stylarioides arenosus, Trophonia capensis

Pectinariidae 
Family Pectinariidae
 Genus Lagis
 Lagis koreni  Malmgren, 1866, syn. Pectinaria (Lagis) koreni, Pectinaria (Lagis) neapolitana, Pectinaria (Lagis) pseudokoreni, Pectinaria koreni, Pectinaria malmgreni, Pectinaria neapolitana, Pectinaria robusta, Solen fragilis
 Lagis koreni (Day, 1963), syn. Pectinaria (Lagis) koreni cirrata, endemic
 Genus Pectinaria
 Pectinaria capensis  (Pallas, 1766), syn. Nereis cylindraria capensis, Sabella capensis, Sabella chrysodon, Sabella indica, Pectinaria (Amphictene) capensis

Sternaspidae 
Family Sternaspidae
 Genus Sternaspis
 Sternaspis scutata  Ranzani, 1817, syn. Thalassema scutatus

Terebellidae 
Family Terebellidae
 Genus Amaeana
 Amaeana accraensis (Augener, 1918), syn. Amaea accraensis
 Amaeana trilobata (Sars, 1863), syn. Polycirrus trilobatus
 Genus Amphitrite
 Amphitrite cirrata (O. F. Müller, 1771 in 1776), syn. Amphiro cirrata, Amphiro foetida, Amphitrite palmata, Amphitrite radiata, Nereis cirrosa, Nereis cirrosa, Spio cirrata, Terebella cirrhata, Terebella montagui, Teredo arenaria
 Amphitrite pauciseta Day, 1963, endemic
 Genus Artacama
 Artacama proboscidea Malmgren, 1866
 Genus Eupolymnia
 Eupolymnia nebulosa (Montagu, 1818), syn. Amphiro nebulosa, Amphitrite meckelii, Amphitritoides rapax, Pallonia rapax, Pista cristata occidentalis, Polymnia nebulosa, Terebella debilis, Terebella nebulosa, Terebella tuberculata
 Genus Hauchiella
 Hauchiella tribullata (McIntosh, 1869), syn. Hauchiella peterseni, Polycirrus tribullata
 Genus Lanassa
 Lanassa capensis Day 1955, endemic
 Genus Lanice
 Lanice conchilega (Pallas, 1766), syn. Amphitrite flexuosa, Amphitrite tondi, Nereis conchilega, Terebella artifex, Terebella littoralis seu arenaria, Terebella pectoralis, Terebella prudens, Wartelia gonotheca
 Genus Loimia
 Loimia medusa (Savigny in Lamarck, 1818), syn. Terebella medusa
 Genus Lysilla
 Lysilla ubianensis Caullery, 1944
 Genus Nicolea
 Nicolea venustula (Montagu, 1818), syn. Nicolea arctica, Nicolea viridis, Terebella parvula, Terebella venustula, Terebella vestita
 Nicolea macrobranchia (Schmarda, 1861), syn. Terebella macrobranchia
 Genus Pista
 Pista cristata (Müller, 1776), syn. Amphitrite cristata, Axionice cristata, Idalia vermiculus, Terebella turrita
 Pista fasciata (Grube, 1870), syn. Dendrophora fasciata, Terebella (Phyzelia) fasciata
 Pista foliigera Caullery, 1915
 Pista quadrilobata Augener, 1918, syn. Nicolea quadrilobata
 Pista unibranchia Day, 1963 
 Genus Polycirrus
 Polycirrus haematodes (Claparède, 1864), syn. Aphlebina haematodes, Apneumea leoncina
 Polycirrus plumosus (Wollebaek, 1912), syn. Ereutho plumosa
 Polycirrus tenuisetis Langerhans, 1881	
 Genus Streblosoma
 Streblosoma abranciata Day, 1963, endemic
 Streblosoma chilensis (McIntosh, 1885), syn. Euthelepus chilensis
 Streblosoma hesslei Day, 1955		
 Streblosoma persica (Fauvel, 1908), syn. Grymaea persica
 Genus Telothelepus
 Telothelepus capensis Day, 1955
 Genus Terebella
 Terebella pterochaeta (McIntosh, 1885), syn. Schmardanella pterochaeta
 Terebella schmardai Linnaeus, 1767, syn. Leprea (Terebella) lapidaria
 Genus Terebellobranchia
 Terebellobranchia natalensis Day 1951, endemic
 Genus Thelepus
 Thelepus comatus (Grube, 1859), syn. Terebella comata, Thelepus natans
 Thelepus pequenianus Augener, 1918
 Thelepus plagiostoma (Schmarda, 1861), syn. Neottis rugosa Terebella heterobranchia, Terebella plagiostoma, Thelepus setosus
 Thelepus triserialis (Grube, 1855), syn. Neottis triserialis, Terebella triserialis

Trichobranchidae 
Family Trichobranchidae
 Genus Terebellides
 Terebellides stroemii  Sars, 1835, syn. Aponobranchus perrieri, Corephorus elegans, Terebella pecten, Terebellides carnea, Terebellides stroemi
 Genus Trichobranchus
 Trichobranchus glacialis  Malmgren, 1866, syn. Trichobranchus massiliensis

Scolecida 
Order Scolecida

Arenicolidae 
Family Arenicolidae
 Genus Abarenicola
 Abarenicola affinis Wells, 1963		
 Abarenicola gilchristi Wells, 1963
 Genus Arenicola
 Arenicola loveni Kinberg, 1867, endemic
 Genus Branchiomaldane
 Branchiomaldane vincenti Langerhans, 1881, syn. Clymenides incertus

Capitellidae 
Family Capitellidae
 Genus Capitella
 Capitella capitata (Fabricius, 1780), syn. Ancistria acuta, Capitella capitata belgica, Capitella capitata danica, Capitella capitata hebridarum, Capitella capitata neapolitana, Capitella capitata suchumica, Capitella fabricii, Capitella prototypa, Capitella similis, Lombricus canalium, Lumbriconais marina, Lumbricus capitatus, Lumbricus litoralis, Matla bengalensis, Saenuris barbata, Valla ciliata
 Genus Dasybranchus
 Dasybranchus bipartitus (Schmarda, 1861), syn. Branchoscolex craspidochaetus, Branchoscolex oligobranchus, Branchoscolex sphaerochaetus, Oncoscolex bipartitus
 Dasybranchus caducus (Grube, 1846), syn. Dasybranchus cirratus, Dasybranchus umbrinus, Dasymallus caducus, Notomastus roseus
 Genus Heteromastus
 Heteromastus filiformis (Claparède, 1864), syn. Ancistria capillaris, Ancistria minima, Areniella filiformis, Capitella costana, Capitella filiformis, Capitella fimbriata, Notomastus filiformis, Notomastus laevis
 Genus Leiochrides
 Leiochrides africanus Augener, 1918
 Genus Mediomastus
 Mediomastus capensis Day, 1961
 Genus Notomastus
 Notomastus aberans Day, 1957
 Notomastus fauveli Day, 1955
 Notomastus latericeus Sars, 1851, syn. Arenia cruenta, Arenia fragilis, Capitella rubicunda, Notomastus (Tremomastus) fertilis, Notomastus benedeni

Cossuridae 
Family Cossuridae
 Genus Cossura
 Cossura coasta  Kitamori, 1960

Maldanidae 
Family Maldanidae
 Genus Asychis
 Asychis capensis Day, 1961, endemic
 Genus Axiothella
 Axiothella quadrimaculata Augener, 1914, syn. Microclymene quadrimaculata
 Axiothella jarli Kirkegaard, 1959
 Genus Euclymene
 Euclymene glandularis (Day, 1955), syn. Clymene glandularis, endemic
 Euclymene lombricoides (Quatrefages, 1866), syn. Axiothella zetlandica, Clymene brachysoma, Clymene lombricoides, Clymene modesta, Clymene zostericola
 Euclymene luderitziana Augener, 1918
 Euclymene lyrocephala (Schmarda, 1861), syn. Clymene lyrocephala
 Euclymene natalensis (Day, 1957), syn. Clymene natalensis
 Euclymene oerstedi (Claparède, 1863), syn. Caesicirrus neglectus, Clymene (Euclymene) oerstedii, Clymene claparedei, Clymene digitata, Clymene oerstedii, Leiocephalus coronatus
 Genus Johnstonia
 Johnstonia knysna Day, 1955, endemic
 Genus Leiochone
 Leiochone tenuis Day, 1957, syn. Clymenura tenuis
 Genus Lumbriclymene
 Lumbriclymene cylindricauda Sars, 1872, syn. Lumbricus tubicola
 Lumbriclymene minor Arwidsson, 1906
 Genus Macroclymene
 Macroclymene saldanha (Day, 1955), syn. Clymene (Praxillella) saldanha, endemic
 Genus Maldane
 Maldane sarsi Malmgren, 1865, syn. Clymene koreni, Maldane sarsi tropica
 Genus Maldanella
 Maldanella capensis Day, 1961, endemic
 Maldanella fibrillata Chamberlin, 1919		
 Genus Nicomache
 Nicomache lumbricalis (Fabricius, 1780), syn. Clymene lumbricalis Savigny, Clymene microcephala, Nicomache capensis, Nicomache carinata, Sabella lumbricalis
 Genus Praxillella
 Praxillella affinis (M. Sars in G.O. Sars, 1872), syn. Clymene (Praxillella) affinis, Clymene affinis, Clymene lophoseta
 Praxillella capensis (McIntosh, 1885), syn. Praxilla capensis
 Genus Petaloproctus
 Petaloproctus terricolus Quatrefages, 1866, syn. Clymene spatulata, Maldane cristagalli, Nicomache mcintoshi, Petaloproctus terricola
 Genus Rhodine
 Rhodine gracilior Tauber, 1879, syn. Rhodine loveni breviceps, Rhodine loveni gracilior

Opheliidae 
Family Opheliidae
 Genus Armandia
 Armandia intermedia Fauvel, 1902		
 Armandia leptocirris (Grube, 1878), syn. Armandia leptocirrus, Ophelina (Armandia) leptocirris
 Armandia longicaudata (Caullery, 1944), syn. Ammotrypane longicaudata
 Genus Ophelia
 Ophelia africana Tebble, 1953, endemic
 Ophelia agulhana Day, 1961, endemic
 Ophelia capensis Kirkegaard, 1959, endemic
 Ophelia roscoffensis Augener, 1910, syn. Ophelia limacina roscoffensis
 Genus Ophelina
 Ophelina acuminata Örsted, 1843, syn. Ammotrypane aulogaster, Ammotrypane ingebrigtsenii, Ophelia acuminata
 Genus Polyophthalmus
 Polyophthalmus pictus (Dujardin, 1839), syn. Armandia robertianae, Nais picta, Polyophthalmus agilis, Polyophthalmus australis, Polyophthalmus ceylonensis, Polyophthalmus collaris, Polyophthalmus dubius, Polyophthalmus ehrenbergi, Polyophthalmus floridanus, Polyophthalmus incertus, Polyophthalmus longisetosus, Polyophthalmus pallidus, Polyophthalmus papillatus, Polyophthalmus pictus pontica, Polyophthalmus striatus
 Genus Travisia
 Travisia concinna (Kinberg, 1866), syn. Dindymene concinna, endemic
 Travisia forbesii Johnston, 1840, syn. Ammotrypane oestroides, Ophelia mamillata, Ophelia mamillata crassa, Travisia forbesi

Orbiniidae 
Family Orbiniidae
 Genus Haploscoloplos
 Haploscoloplos kerguelensis (McIntosh, 1885), syn. Scoloplos kerguelensis, Scoloplos mawsoni	
 Genus Leitoscoloplos
 Leitoscoloplos fragilis (Verrill, 1873), syn. Anthostoma fragile, Haploscoloplos fragilis, Scoloplos fragilis
 Genus Naineris
 Naineris laevigata (Grube, 1855), syn. Aricia (Scoloplos) fuscibranchis, Aricia laevigata, Theodisca anserina, Theodisca liriostoma
 Genus Orbinia
 Orbinia angrapequensis (Augener, 1918), syn. Aricia angrapequensis
 Orbinia bioreti (Fauvel, 1919), syn. Aricia bioreti
 Orbinia cuvierii (Audouin & Milne Edwards, 1833), syn. Aricia cuvieri perpapillata, Aricia cuvierii, Aricia sertulata, Orbinia cuvieri
 Orbinia monroi Day, 1955
 Genus Phylo
 Phylo capensis Day, 1961, endemic
 Phylo foetida (Orlandi, 1896), syn. Aricia foetida ligustica, Aricia ligustica, Aricia ramosa
 Genus Scoloplos
 Scoloplos armiger (Müller, 1776), syn. Scoloplos armiger
 Scoloplos johnstonei (Day, 1934), syn. Scoloplos johnstonei, endemic
 Scoloplos madagascariensis (Fauvel, 1919), syn. Scoloplos madagascarensis, Scoloplos madagascariensis
 Scoloplos uniramus Day, 1961, endemic
 Genus Scolaricia
 Scolaricia capensis Day, 1961, endemic
 Scolaricia dubia (Day, 1955), syn. Orbinia dubia, Scoloplos (Scoloplos) dayi, endemic

Paraonidae 
Family Paraonidae
 Genus Aedicira
 Aedicira belgicae (Fauvel, 1936), syn. Aedicira belgicae
 Genus Aricidea
 Aricidea capensis Day, 1961, syn. Aricidea capensis
 Aricidea cerrutii Laubier, 1966, syn. Acmira cerrutii, Aricidea (Acesta) cerrutii, Aricidea (Aricidea) jeffreysii, Aricidea cerrutii, Aricidea jeffreysii, Aricidea jeffreysi
 Aricidea curviseta Day, 1963, syn. Aricidea curviseta, endemic
 Aricidea longobranchiata Day, 1961, syn. Aricidea (Aricidea) longobranchiata
 Aricidea lopezi Berkeley & Berkeley, 1956, syn. Aricidea (Aricidea) fauveli, Aricidea fauveli, Aricidea lopezi
 Aricidea simplex Day, 1963, syn. Acmira simplex, Aricidea simplex, Aricidea suecica simplex
 Genus Cirrophorus
 Cirrophorus branchiatus Ehlers, 1908, syn. Cirrophorus lyriformis
 Genus Levinsenia
 Levinsenia gracilis (Tauber, 1879), syn. Aonides gracilis, Paraonis filiformis, Paraonis gracilis, Paraonis ivanovi, Paraonis gracilis gracilis
 Levinsenia oculata (Hartman, 1957), syn. Paraonis gracilis oculata
 Genus Paradoneis
 Paradoneis lyra (Southern, 1914), syn. Cirrophorus lyra, Paraonis (Paraonides) lyra, Paraonis lyra, Paraonides lyra lyra
 Paradoneis lyra (Day, 1955), syn. Paraonis (Paraonides) lyra capensis, Paraonides lyra capensis, endemic

Scalibregmatidae 
Family Scalibregmatidae
 Genus Asclerocheilus
 Asclerocheilus capensis Day, 1963, endemic
 Genus Hyboscolex
 Hyboscolex longiseta Schmarda, 1861, syn. Lipobranchius capensis, Oncoscolex dicranochaetus, Oncoscolex homochaetus
 Genus Parasclerocheilus
 Parasclerocheilus capensis Day, 1961		
 Genus Polyphysia
 Polyphysia crassa (Örsted, 1843), syn. Eumenia crassa, Eumenia ebranchiata, Eumeniopsis typica, Polyphysia quaterbranchia
 Genus Scalibregma
 Scalibregma inflatum Rathke, 1843, syn. Eumenia crassa arctica, Oligobranchus groenlandicus, Oligobranchus roseus, Scalibregma abyssorum, Scalibregma brevicauda, Scalibregma inflatum corethrurum, Scalibregma minutum

Notes

References

South African animal biodiversity lists
Polychaetes